Alberto Meda is an engineer focusing on design, born in Tremezzina, in the Italian province of Como in 1945. He graduated with a laurea in mechanical engineering at the Politecnico di Milano in 1969. From 1973 he was the technical manager of Kartell, in charge of the development of projects of furniture and plastic laboratory equipment.

In 1979 he worked as a freelance industrial designer for various companies: Alfa Romeo Auto, Alias, Alessi, Arabia-Finland, Cinelli, Colombo design, Brevetti Gaggia, JcDecaux, Ideal Standard, Luceplan, Legrand, Mandarina Duck, Omron Japan, Philips, Olivetti, Vitra, etc.

Alberto Meda came to design from engineering, bringing with him a pragmatic mind and an attention to details in materials and production process, in addition to formal concerns. This applied-science background has shaped Meda’s recognizable stamp of elegant simplicity, designs that are at once modern in form, and organic in feel. It was this individual sophistication that caught the eye of Rolf Fehlbaum, the chairman of the Swiss manufacturer Vitra, who commissioned the Italian engineer to design a chair some 20 years ago. Thus began a collaboration that continues to this day, resulting in some of the most memorable seating pieces up to and including the MedaPro and the newest design from 2005, the MedaPal.

“Creativitalia” (Tokio1990) e una personale alla Design Gallery di Matzuia Ginza (Tokio1990).   
XVIII Triennale, ‘La leggerezza’ sezione del ‘Il Giardino delle cose’ (Milano1992). 
“Mestieri d’autore” (Siena1993),  
“Mutant materials in contemporary design“ al MOMA-(New York 1995)
“Meda-Rizzatto” alla Galerie Binnen (Amsterdam 1996)
Designer of the year, personale al Salon du Meuble (Parigi 1999)
“Italia e Giappone: design come stile di vita” (Yokohama, kobe 2001)
Design and Elastic Mind- Moma 2008
Triennale di Milano Il Design Italiano oltre le crisi-2014
Youthful - spazio Domus, Milano 2015
The Bauhaus#itsalldesign. Vitra Design Museum  2015

Teaching and research 
From 1983 to 1987 lecturer on industrial technology at Domus Academy.
Seminars at International Design Symposium in Fukui, at Workshop Design Quest  in Osaka, and at Design Center in Tokyo.
From 1995 lecturer at Politecnico of Milan "Corso di Laurea di Disegno Industriale" with  a  design lab. 
From 1995 to 1997 member of  Board of  Designlabor Bremerhaven
From 2003 to 2007 lecturer at IUAV in Venice with design workshops.
From 2016 Member of the Scientific Committee of the Fondazione Politecnico di Milano
Several lectures and seminars such as  Chicago, St.Louis at Washington University,  Stockholm, Miami, San Paulo, Taipei, Ulm, Istanbul, Toronto, Mexico, HongKong, Firenze, Oslo, Istanbul, Lausanne, Seul, Chicago

Awards 
1989 "Compasso d'oro"  Lola lamp(Luceplan)
1994 "Compasso d'oro" "Metropoli" lamps (Luceplan) 
2008 "Compasso d'oro"  MIX lamp (Luceplan)
2011 "Compasso d'oro"  Teak table(Alias)
2016 "Compasso d'oro"  Flap acoustic panel  (Caimi Brevetti)
2018 “Compasso d’oro” Origami screen-radiator (Tubes)
2005 “Hon Royal Designer  for Industry” Londra RSA
2007 "INDEX:award" Solar Bottle
1992 "Design Plus”  Titania lamp, Luceplan 
1994 "European Design Prize", Luceplan
1995 "Industrie Forum design" Hannover  UNI – X  family lamps,  
1996 "Industrie Forum design" Hannover  Titania Clamp lamp
1997 Good design Gold Prize–Japan   Meda chair, Vitra 
1998 I.D  design review ’Best of category’    Meda chair, Vitra
1999 Designer of the year,  Salon du Meuble de Paris
2000 Bundespreis Produktdesign   Meda chair, Vitra
2001 Good Design Award Chicago Athenaeum  Water Jug,  Arabia
2002  Reddot Award  knives, Iittala  Finland 
2006 "Design Plus" e “Light of the future”  MIX  lamp, Luceplan
2012 Best of – Design Plus per  OttoWatt, Luceplan
2014 Best of Neocon (U.S.A) Silver Award  Flap, Caimi Brevetti 
2015 German Design Award  Flap, Caimi Brevetti
2016 DesignEuropa Awards (EUIPO)  Flap, Caimi Brevetti
2016 Good Design Award Chicago Athenaeum Origami, Tubes
2017 Red Dot  with Frame 52, Alias
2018 Red Dot Best of the Best with Aledin lamp, Kartell

Some products are part of permanent collection of Museum of Modern Art of Toyama and since 1994 The Museum of Modern Art in New York, includes in its Design Collection "Light light " chair 1987, "Soft light "chair 1989, "Longframe" 1991 by Alias, and "On-Off" lamp by Luceplan1988.

He works and lives in Milan.

References

External links
 Biography at Meda's website
 Profile at DesignCelebrity

1945 births
Living people
Polytechnic University of Milan alumni
Italian engineers
Italian interior designers
Italian industrial designers
Italian furniture designers
Italian designers
Designers
Compasso d'Oro Award recipients
Royal Designers for Industry